The 2008 Chrono Champenois – Trophée Européen was the 10th running of the Chrono Champenois - Trophée Européen, a women's individual time trial bicycle race. It was rated by the UCI as a 1.1 category race.

Results

Sources

See also

 2007 Chrono Champenois - Trophée Européen
 2010 Chrono Champenois - Trophée Européen
 2013 Chrono Champenois - Trophée Européen

References

External links

Chrono Champenois - Trophee Europeen
Chrono Champenois - Trophee Europeen
Chrono Champenois - Trophee Europeen
Chrono Champenois – Trophée Européen